Luperini is a tribe of skeletonizing leaf beetles in the family Chrysomelidae. There are more than 30 genera and 500 described species in Luperini.

Genera
The genera below belong to the tribe Luperini:

 Acalymma Barber, 1947
 Agetocera Hope, 1831
 Amphelasma Barber, 1947
 Androlyperus Crotch, 1873
 Anisobrotica Bechyné & Bechyné, 1970
 Apophylia Thomson, 1858
 Apteromicrus Chen & Jiang, 1981
 Aristobrotica Bechyné, 1956
 Atrachya Dejean, 1837
 Aulacophora Chevrolat in Dejean, 1836
 Brachyphora Jacoby, 1890
 Buckibrotica Bechyné & Bechyné, 1970
 Cassena Weise, 1892
 Calomicrus Dillwyn, 1829
 Cerophysa Chevrolat in Dejean, 1836
 Cerophysella Laboissière, 1930
 Cerotoma Chevrolat in Dejean, 1836
 Charaea Baly, 1878
 Clerotilia Jacoby, 1885
 Cneorane Baly, 1865
 Cneoranidea Chen, 1942
 Cneorella Medvedev & Dang, 1981
 Cochabamba Bechyné, 1955
 Cornubrotica Bechyné & Bechyné, 1970
 Coronabrotica Moura, 2010
 Cyclotrypema Blake, 1966
 Diabrotica Chevrolat in Dejean, 1836
 Doryscus Jacoby, 1887
 Ensiforma Jacoby, 1876
 Epaenidea Gressitt & Kimoto, 1963
 Eusattodera Schaeffer, 1906
 Euliroetis Ogloblin, 1936
 Eumelepta Jacoby, 1892
 Fleutiauxia Laboissière, 1933
 Gynandrobrotica Bechyné, 1955
 Haplosomoides Duvivier, 1890
 Hesperomorpha Ogloblin, 1936
 Hoplasoma Jacoby, 1884
 Hoplosaenidea Laboissière, 1933
 Hyphaenia Baly, 1865
 Inbioluperus Clark, 1993
 Isotes Weise, 1922
 Japonitata Strand, 1922
 Jolibrotica Lee & Bezděk, 2015
 Keitheatus Wilcox, 1965
 Lanolepta Kimoto, 1991
 Leptaulaca Weise, 1902
 Liroetis Weise, 1889 (= Siemssenius Weise, 1922 = Zangia Chen, 1976)
 Luperosoma Jacoby, 1891
 Luperus Muller, 1764
 Lygistus Wilcox, 1965
 Macrima Baly, 1878
 Medythia Jacoby, 1886
 Metacoryna Jacoby, 1888
 Metrioidea Fairmaire, 1881
 Mimagitocera Maulik, 1936
 Mimastra Baly, 1865
 Monolepta Chevrolat in Dejean, 1836
 Munina Chen, 1976
 Neobrotica Jacoby, 1887
 Paleosepharia Laboissière, 1936
 Palmaria Bechyné, 1956
 Palpoxena Baly, 1861
 Paragetocera Laboissière, 1929
 Paranapiacaba J. Bechyné, 1958
 Paraplotes Laboissière, 1933
 Paratriarius Schaeffer, 1906
 Parexosoma Laboissière, 1932
 Paridea Baly, 1886
 Phyllecthris Dejean, 1836
 Phyllobrotica Chevrolat in Dejean, 1836
 Platybrotica Cabrera & Cabrera Walsh, 2004
 Pseudespera Chen et al., 1985
 Pseudocophora Jacoby, 1884
 Pseudodiabrotica Jacoby, 1892
 Pseudoluperus Beller & Hatch, 1932
 Pseudosepharia Laboissière, 1936
 Pteleon Jacoby, 1888
 Scelida Chapuis, 1875
 Scelolyperus Crotch, 1874
 Shaira Maulik, 1936
 Shairella Chujo, 1962
 Sikkimia Duvivier, 1891
 Sinoluperus Gressitt & Kimoto, 1963
 Strobiderus Jacoby, 1884
 Synetocephalus Fall, 1910
 Taiwanaenidea Kimoto, 1984
 Taumacera Thunberg, 1814
 Theopea Baly, 1864
 Trachyscelida Horn, 1893
 Triarius Jacoby, 1887
 Trichobalya Weise, 1890
 Trichomimastra Weise, 1922
 Trichosepharia Laboissière, 1936
 Xingeina Chen et al., 1987
 Zischkaita Bechyné, 1956
 Zizonia Chen, 1976

References

Further reading

External links

 

Galerucinae